The Cambridge University by-election, 1895 could refer to:
Cambridge University by-election, August 1887
Cambridge University by-election, November 1887